Aegae or Aigai, or Aegaeae or Aigaiai (Αἰγαῖαι), or Aegeae or Aigeai (Αἴγεαι), was a town on the coast of ancient Cilicia, on the north side of the Bay of Issus. It is now separated from the outlet of the Pyramus (the modern Ceyhan) by a long narrow estuary called Gulf of Alexandretta. In Strabo's time it was a small city with a port. Aegae was a Greek town, but the origin of it is unknown. A Greek inscription of the Roman period has been discovered there; and under the Roman dominion it was a place of some importance. Tacitus calls it Aegeae. It was Christianised at an early date, and while no longer retaining a residential bishop, remains a titular see of the Roman Catholic Church, under the name of Aegeae.

Its site is located near the modern Yumurtalık.

People
Zenobios and Zenobia (d. ), bishop of Aegae and his sister, martyrs and Eastern Orthodox saints

References

Populated places in ancient Cilicia
Former populated places in Turkey
Greek colonies in Anatolia
Yumurtalık
Catholic titular sees in Asia